Alexander Alekseyevich Sizonenko (20 July 1959 – 5 January 2012) was a Soviet professional basketball player. Sizonenko was said to have grown since this measurement was taken, although age reduced his standing height considerably. Because of his enormous growth, his mobility was increasingly impaired.

Basketball career
Sizonenko played professionally for Spartak Leningrad (1976–1978) and for Stroitel Kuybyshev (1979–1986).
Sizonenko was also a member of the Soviet national team and appeared on its behalf for 12 games.

Personal life
Sizonenko was born in the city of Zaporizhzhia, Ukrainian SSR. He lived in Saint Petersburg, was divorced and had a son Alexander born in 1994. In 2011 he was moved to a hospital in St. Petersburg, where he died on 5 January 2012. He was 52.

References

External links
 - The Tallest Man: Alexander Sizonenko
 So lebt der längste Mensch der Welt, Jens Hartmann 
 

?

1959 births
2012 deaths
Sportspeople from Zaporizhzhia
People with gigantism
Soviet men's basketball players
Centers (basketball)
Ukrainian men's basketball players
Ukrainian Soviet Socialist Republic people